There have been two baronetcies created for people with the surname Tollemache, or Talmash, one in the Baronetage of England and one in the Baronetage of Great Britain.

Tollemache Baronetcy of Helmingham
The Tollemache Baronetcy, of Helmingham in the County of Suffolk, was created in the Baronetage of England on 22 May 1611 for Lionel Tollemache, High Sheriff of Suffolk in 1609 and 1617. The second Baronet represented Orford in the House of Commons. The third Baronet married Elizabeth Murray, 2nd Countess of Dysart. Their son Lionel succeeded to both the baronetcy and earldom. The baronetcy remained a subsidiary title of the earldom until the death of his younger son, Wilbraham Tollemache, 6th Earl of Dysart and seventh Baronet, in 1821, when the baronetcy became extinct. The earldom of Dysart is extant.

Tollemache baronets, of Helmingham (1611)
Sir Lionel Tollemache, 1st Baronet (1562–)
Sir Lionel Tollemache, 2nd Baronet (1591–1640)
Sir Lionel Tollemache, 3rd Baronet (1624–1669)
Lionel Tollemache, 3rd Earl of Dysart, 4th Baronet (1649–1727)
Lionel Tollemache, 4th Earl of Dysart, 5th Baronet (1708–1770)
Lionel Tollemache, 5th Earl of Dysart, 6th Baronet (1734–1799)
Wilbraham Tollemache, 6th Earl of Dysart, 7th Baronet (1739–1821)

Tollemache Baronetcy of Hanby Hall
The Tollemache Baronetcy, of Hanby Hall in the County of Lincoln, was created in the Baronetage of Great Britain on 12 January 1793 for William Manners. He was the eldest son of Louisa Tollemache, 7th Countess of Dysart, who had succeeded her elder brother the sixth Earl in 1821 (see above). On his mother's succession, Manners assumed by Royal licence the surname of Talmash (or Tollemache) and gained the courtesy title of Lord Huntingtower. His father was John Manners, son of Lord William Manners, younger son of John Manners, 2nd Duke of Rutland (see Duke of Rutland for earlier history of the Manners family). He predeceased his mother and was succeeded in the baronetcy by his son, the second Baronet. He later succeeded his grandmother as the eighth Earl of Dysart. The baronetcy and earldom remained united until the death of his grandson, the ninth Earl and third Baronet, in 1935. He was succeeded in the earldom by his niece while the baronetcy passed to a male heir, the fourth Baronet. As a male-line descendant of the second Duke of Rutland, the seventh and present holder of the baronetcy is also in remainder to this peerage and its subsidiary titles.

Tollemache baronets, of Hanby Hall (1793)
Sir William Tollemache, 1st Baronet (1766–1833) (known as Lord Huntingtower from 1821)
Lionel William John Tollemache, 8th Earl of Dysart, 2nd Baronet (1794–1878)
William John Manners Tollemache, 9th Earl of Dysart, 3rd Baronet (1859–1935)
Sir Lyonel Felix Carteret Eugene Tollemache, 4th Baronet (1854–1952)
Sir Cecil Lyonel Newcomen Tollemache, 5th Baronet (1886–1969)
Sir Humphrey Thomas Tollemache, 6th Baronet (1897–1990)
Sir Lyonel Humphrey John Tollemache, 7th Baronet (1931–2020)
Sir Richard John Tollemache, 8th Baronet (born 1966) (2020–present)

The heir apparent is the present holder's son Lyonel James Gordon Tollemache (born 1999).

See also
Baron Tollemache
Duke of Rutland
Earl of Dysart
Ham House
Helmingham Hall
Tollemache family

References

Sources
Kidd, Charles, Williamson, David (editors). Debrett's Peerage and Baronetage (1990 edition). New York: St Martin's Press, 1990.

External links 
European Heraldry page

 

Baronetcies in the Baronetage of Great Britain
Extinct baronetcies in the Baronetage of England
1611 establishments in England
1793 establishments in Great Britain